EJBCA (formerly: Enterprise JavaBeans Certificate Authority) is a free software public key infrastructure (PKI) certificate authority software package maintained and sponsored by the Swedish for-profit company PrimeKey Solutions AB, which holds the copyright to most of the codebase. The project's source code is available under the terms of the Lesser GNU General Public License (LGPL). The EJBCA software package is used to install a privately operated certificate authority. This is in contrast to commercial certificate authorities that are operated by a trusted third party. Since its inception EJBCA has been used as certificate authority software for different use cases, including eGovernment, endpoint management, research, energy, eIDAS, telecom, networking, and for usage in SMEs.

See also 
 Public key infrastructure

References

Further reading 
 Research and application of EJBCA based on J2EE; Liyi Zhang, Qihua Liu and Min Xu; IFIP International Federation for Information Processing Volume 251/2008;

External links 
 

Public key infrastructure
Cryptographic software
Free security software
Software using the LGPL license
Products introduced in 2001
Java enterprise platform
Java platform software